Jan Willem Nienhuys (born 16 April 1942) is a Dutch mathematician, book translator and skeptic. He taught mathematics at the Eindhoven University of Technology. He is also a board member and secretary of Stichting Skepsis and an editor of its magazine Skepter.

Biography 
Nienhuys studied mathematics in the Netherlands, and in 1966/67 at Tulane University in New Orleans, where he met his future wife. On 14 September 1970, he earned his doctorate in mathematics at Utrecht University under guidance of his promotor Hans Freudenthal. His dissertation was published the same year in the journal Indagationes Mathematicae (Proceedings). Next, he was mathematics teacher for two years at the National Taiwan University in Taipei, Taiwan. Since 1973, he taught mathematics at the Eindhoven University of Technology. Furthermore, Nienhuys assisted several writers in completing their books, and translated books to Dutch.

Nienhuys married Cheng Shan-Hwei and they have two sons. She was born in Sichuan during the Second Sino-Japanese War and was raised in Taiwan, where she studied mathematics as well, finishing her studies in the United States. Then she taught informatics at the Erasmus University Rotterdam. Furthermore, she is director of the Chinese School Eindhoven. The couple published an article together in 1979, Onwaar versus onzinnig in the Dutch journal Euclides, and co-authored a book about China, China: Geschiedenis, Cultuur, Wetenschap, Kunst En Politiek (2007).

Skepticism 
Nienhuys is a prolific skeptic. Amongst other things he has written several articles on pseudoscience, mainly about quackery such as homeopathy and the anti-vaccination movement. Since the late 1980s he has served as board member and since 2003 secretary of Stichting Skepsis. Moreover, Nienhuys writes articles as editorial staff member of the magazine Skepter. From July 2008 until 6 November 2010, he was editor-in-chief of the website of the Vereniging tegen de Kwakzalverij.

In 1983, Nienhuys criticised the confluence model of Robert B. Zajonc and Gregory B. Markus. This mathematical model would serve as proof that a connection existed between the order of birth and intelligence to the advantage of the firstborn, as Lillian Belmont and Francis A. Marolla concluded in 1973 from a registration of the Dutch armed forces. This record consisted of the data of nearly 400,000 19-year-old men born in the period 1944–1947, originally collected to investigate the effects of the Hunger Winter (1944–1945) on mental and physical development. According to Nienhuys, Zajonc and Markus's model contained errors in the logic, calculations and methodology used.

Since 2010, Nienhuys has been a fellow of the Committee for Skeptical Inquiry. He often lectures at skeptical conferences such as Skepsis congresses and SKEPP conventions. On 4 October 2014, Nienhuys received the Gebroeders Bruinsma Erepenning, an award of the Vereniging tegen de Kwakzalverij. The society praised Nienhuys for his "enormous engagement, an amazing ability to quickly master certain issues, an enormous productivity and an unparalleled accuracy."

Works 
Author
 De Bruijn's combinatorics: Classroom notes (2011).

Co-author
 China: Geschiedenis, Cultuur, Wetenschap, Kunst En Politiek (2007), with Shan-Hwei Nienhuys-Cheng. ;
 Tussen Waarheid en Waanzin: een Encyclopedie der Pseudo-Wetenschappen (1997), with Marcel Hulspas. ;
 Discrete wiskunde (1991), with Jack H. van Lint. ;
 Programmeren met Pascal (1988), with Shan-Hwei Nienhuys-Cheng. .

Contributions
 Leugens over Louwes: Deventer moordzaak (2011), Ton Derksen. ;
 The Mars Effect: A French test of over 1 000 sports champions (1996), Claude Benski et al. .

Translations
Nienhuys has translated many popular science books to Dutch, including:
 Poincaré: wiskundige en filosoof (2013), Umberto Bottazzini. ;
 Turing: bouwer van de eerste computers (2010), Jean Lassègue. ;
 De Natuurwetten: van Archimedes tot Hawking (2010), Clifford A. Pickover. ;
 Wetenschap en Islam: Verslag Van Een Vergeten Bloeiperiode (2009), Ehsan Masood. .

Scientific publications

References

External links 

 Publications of Jan Willem Nienhuys in the catalogue of the Eindhoven University of Technology
 Jan Willem Nienhuys in the Poortmans repertorium
 Jan Willem Nienhuys in the Ghent University Library

1942 births
Living people
20th-century Dutch mathematicians
Dutch skeptics
Utrecht University alumni
Scientists from The Hague